Mediocre is the debut studio album by Mexican singer-songwriter Ximena Sariñana, released in the United States on  via Warner Music Mexico. Mediocre reached number ten on the Billboard Latin Pop Albums, and spawned the hit single "Vidas Paralelas" ("Parallel Lives").

Mediocre garnered positive reviews from many critics, receiving five stars from SoMinty, four stars from Time Out, and four stars from Rolling Stone magazine. Many critics praised the album for being an eclectic album with a diverse style of songs featuring pop, rock, alternative, and nueva canción styles. It helped Sariñana receive a nomination for Best New Artist at the 9th Annual Latin Grammy Awards, it also received a nomination for Best Latin Rock, Alternative or Urban Album at the 51st Annual Grammy Awards. In summer 2023, Sariñana will perform three shows at the National Auditorium's Lunario, performing the entire album and its bonus tracks in celebration of the 15th anniversary of its release.

Theme 
Sariñana clarified that her title choice, "Mediocre", means to denounce mediocrity and conformity. She explained in an interview, "This whole idea of the perfect woman of the ‘50s is what the title song is about... There was no possibility of being something different, and that, in turn, created a prototype of a woman who was mediocre."

The album artwork for Mediocre meant to emulate the theme of mediocrity. Sariñana elaborated, "The cover is a take on the idea that women in the ‘40s and ‘50s had to be ‘perfect.’ Perfect hair, perfect clothes, sitting quietly and making perfect meals and embroidering perfectly. And, ironically, they were all perfect in the same, uninteresting way so that ended up making them all mediocre. That was the idea." Sariñana stressed that she did not intend to produce mediocre content for the album: "It’s not to say that the material is mediocre, but rather that it’s a message of irony, and I think the public gets that, but there are some people out there who like to poke fun at the title."

Recording and production 
Recording commenced in Buenos Aires, Argentina, in May 2007 and finished in August 2007. Various studio musicians were brought in for the recording of Mediocre. Bruno Bressa, the drummer of Volován, helped in the production process of the album, and  also played the keyboard and tabla for its tracks. Argentine producer Tweety González and Uruguayan producer Juan Campodónico produced the album in 2008.

Musical style 

Mediocre showcases rock, pop, and hip-hop influences. Jimmy Draper of Time Out New York describes the musical style as "full of buoyant, jazz-inflected pop with occasional electronic underpinnings and outbursts of rock". The album opens with "Mediocre", a heavily rock-influenced track, leading to the pop single "Vidas Paralelas". Sariñana relies heavily upon the piano in the pop track "Normal", which also features brass and vocal harmonies. "La Tina" displays a hip-hop influence through its use of electronic beats. "No Vuelvo Más" features Sariñana's use of additional vocal harmonies, as well as acoustic guitars. Ron Bronson of SoMinty points out that "Un Error" and "Sintiendo Rara" are slower songs reminiscent of Sariñana's interest in jazz.

Lissette Corsa of Orlando Weekly points out that Mediocre follows a unique contemporary jazz style. Corsa praises Mediocre, calling it a "deftly crafted alt-pop record", but notes that "it’s the electronic embellishments, dub effects and jazz trimmings—in the form of loose piano lines, subtle tempo changes and vocal improvisations—that make it unique." Corsa also praises Sariñana, whose "lyrics exhibit a remarkable depth for someone her age", saying Sariñana has "a keen understanding of composition and melodic  structure".

Genres 
Since Mediocre incorporates many different styles of music, the exact genre of the album is disputed. Allmusic classifies Mediocre as a pop/rock album with adult alternative pop/rock stylings. However, the iTunes Store classifies Mediocre as an alternativo album to accentuate its Latin American style as well as its alternative style. SoMinty classifies Mediocre as an indie pop album, and Rhapsody categorizes Mediocre as nueva canción, or "new song".

Critical reception 

Reception of Mediocre has been mostly positive, and many critics highly acclaim the album. The Rolling Stone staff rated Mediocre four stars, and Rolling Stones average viewer rating is four and a half stars. Mark Kemp, a music journalist from Rolling Stone, called Mediocre one of the strongest debuts from a female singer-songwriter since Norah Jones' Come Away with Me, exclaiming "There's sultry torch songs, folky ballads, smart rock — and not a bum track among them." Ron Bronson, a music journalist from the website SoMinty, awarded Mediocre five stars. He describes Sariñana's voice on Mediocre as being "something along the lines of Nellie McKay meets countryman Julieta Venegas meets Sia. [Her voice is] original, in other words. Very original.... If you have any real desire to listen to music en español, you'll be hard pressed to find a better singer on the indie scene these days. Ximena has got chops, folks." Ernesto Sánchez of People en Español labeled Mediocre "one of the most promising Latin Music albums of [2008]". Eric Danton of The Hartford Courant pointed out that "her prospects in the United States are less predictable thanks to a fragmented radio landscape and what for many English-speaking listeners is a language barrier."

Awards and nominations
Sariñana was nominated for two awards at the Latin Grammy Awards of 2008 for Mejor Nuevo Artista (Best New Artist) and Mejor Canción Alternativa (Best Alternative Song) for her single "Normal". Sariñana won an award at the MTV Latin America Awards 2008 for Artista Revelación (Discovery Artist).

On December 4, 2008 this album received a Grammy Award nomination for Best Latin Rock/Alternative Album.

Track listing

Notes 

 Data for composers compiled from Allmusic.
 Fields with an em dash (—) are not applicable.
All tracks in bold have been released as singles (see the singles section for more details)

Direct notes 
 "La Tina" was remixed by Metronomy in 2008 and released as a single.
 Originally performed by Erik Couts
 Originally performed by the Uruguayan band, Loop Lascano
 Performed with Volován.
 The second version of "Reforma" is only available through the iTunes Store.
 In special edition.

Singles 

Los 40 Principales has announced that a music video for the title song will be released in the near future.

Credits 
The information below is provided by Allmusic, and the personnel are listed in alphabetical order.

Chart performance

Album certifications

See also

Music of Mexico

References

External links 
 Ximena Sariñana - Official website of the singer (in Spanish)
 Ximena Sariñana - Official MySpace profile of the singer (in Spanish)
 Mediocre - Official website of the album (in Spanish)

2008 debut albums
Ximena Sariñana albums
Spanish-language albums
Warner Music Mexico albums